Jeong Yun-Jo (29 October 1995) is a South Korean Taekwondo practitioner. He won the gold medal at the 2017 World Taekwondo Championships on the flyweight category.

References

1995 births
Living people
South Korean male taekwondo practitioners
World Taekwondo Championships medalists
21st-century South Korean people